Sekayu is a town and district which serves as the administrative centre of Musi Banyuasin Regency within South Sumatra Province, Sumatra, Indonesia. The district's population was 78,637 at the 2010 Census and 91,120 at the 2020 Census. The district comprises 14 small towns and villages, of which 4 are kelurahan (urban villages) and ten are desa (rural villages) as follows:

Note: (a) urban village (kelurahan); the rest are rural villages (desa).

References

Populated places in South Sumatra
Regency seats of South Sumatra